Richard Martin or Richard Martyn may refer to:

Entertainment
 Richard Martin (actor) (1917–1994), American actor
 Richard Martin (British director) (born 1935), British television director
 Richard Martin (Canadian director) (born 1956), Canadian film director
 Richard Martin (curator) (1947–1999), fashion historian, curator of the Metropolitan Museum of Art's Costume Institute
 Richard Martin, author of Coal Wars and featured in Bill Nye Saves the World
 Richard Martin, one of the many pen names of John Creasey

Politics
 Richard Martin (Lord Mayor of London) (died 1617), Master of the Mint and Lord Mayor of London
 Richard Martin (Recorder of London) (1570–1618), lawyer and Recorder of London
 Richard Martin (Irish politician) (1754–1834), (a.k.a. "Humanity Dick"), Irish MP and campaigner against cruelty to animals
 Richard Martin (Mayor of Swansea) (1843–1922), industrialist
 Sir Richard Martin, 1st Baronet, of Cappagh (1831–1901), Anglo-Irish baronet and privy counsellor
 Sir Richard Martin, 1st Baronet, of Overbury Court (1838–1916), English banker and Liberal Party politician
 Rick Martin (South Carolina politician) (born 1967), member of the South Carolina House of Representatives
 Richard Martyn (Mayor of Galway) (c. 1602 – 1648), lawyer and member of the Catholic Confederates of Ireland
 Richard Martyn (New Hampshire politician) (1630–1694), State Representative in 1672 and 1679, and Speaker of the House in 1692

Sports
 Richard Martin (cricketer) (1789–?), English cricketer
 Richard Martin (footballer, born 1962) (born 1962), French football player
 Richard Martin (footballer, born 1987) (born 1987), English football player
 Richard D. Martin (1932–2008), American football coach, athletic director and college conference administrator
 Rick Martin (Richard Martin, 1951–2011), Canadian ice-hockey player

Other
 Richard Martin (martyr) (died 1588), English martyr
 Richard Martin (British Army officer) (1847–1907), British Army officer and colonial official
 Richard H. Martin Jr. (1858–1950), British architect in the U.S.
 Richard Milton Martin (1916–1985), American logician and philosopher
 Richard Frewen Martin (1918–2006), British test pilot
 Richard Beamon Martin (1913–2012), bishop in the Episcopal Church

See also
Dick Martin (disambiguation)
Ricky Martin (disambiguation)